The Frederick S. Pardee School of Global Studies (also referred to as The Pardee School and Pardee School of Global Studies) is the public policy school of Boston University. It was officially established in 2015 by consolidating and renaming a number of long-established programs in international and regional studies at Boston University dating back to 1953. The current dean of the Pardee School is Scott Taylor, one of the United States' most respected scholars in African politics and political economy, with a particular focus on business-state relations, private sector development, governance, and political and economic reform. The Pardee School has nearly 1,000 students, including about 800 undergraduate students. It offers six graduate degrees, two graduate certificates, five undergraduate majors, and eight undergraduate minors, and also brings together seven centers and programs of regional and thematic studies.

History
The Pardee School was established based on Boston University's long-standing commitment to global education and was made possible by a $25 million gift by Boston University alumnus Frederick S. Pardee. Prof. Adil Najam, a global development and sustainable development expert and former vice chancellor of the Lahore University of Management Sciences, Pakistan, was named the inaugural dean of the Pardee School. At the conclusion of the 2021-2022 academic year, Prof. Najam stepped down as Dean. On August 31, 2022, Scott Taylor, a former Professor and Vice Dean for Diversity, Equity, and Inclusion at the Georgetown University School of Foreign Service, was appointed Dean of the Pardee School. 

The Pardee School employs nearly 40 full-time tenured or tenure-track faculty and Professors of the Practice as well as a variety of adjunct and visiting professors. Through its Centers and Programs, it has an affiliate faculty across Boston University of nearly 200. It offers 9 graduate degrees, 2 graduate certificates, 5 undergraduate majors, 8 undergraduate minors, and also brings together 7 centers and programs of regional and thematic studies.

The Pardee School describes itself as a school established in and for the 21st century and embraces higher education innovations; for example, in launching its first MOOC in its first year (by Prof. Andrew Bacevich on 'War for the Greater Middle East').

Degree programs
The Pardee School educates undergraduate and graduate students in global affairs and international relations. The Pardee School offers six MA programs with eight functional specializations, two dual-degree programs, one regional degree and two graduate certificates. It also offers five undergraduate majors and eight undergraduate minors.

Undergraduate programs
The Pardee School offers five Bachelor of Arts degrees:
 BA in International Relations
 BA in Asian Studies
 BA in European Studies
 BA in Latin America Studies
 BA in Middle East and North Africa Studies

The Pardee School of Global Studies also Boston University students the opportunity to complete the following eight minors: International relations, African languages and literature, African studies, East Asian studies, European studies, Latin American studies, Muslim cultures, Muslim societies.

Graduate programs
The Pardee School trains graduate students in global affairs and international relations. The school provides significant financial assistance to graduate students for tuition as well as international travel for research. Most degrees require foreign language proficiency and a field internship.

 MA in International Affairs (two-year program). With specializations in (i) Diplomacy, (ii) Global Economic Affairs, (iii) Security Studies, (iv) Religion and International Affairs, and (v) International Communication.
 MA in Global Policy (1.5-year program). With Specializations in (i) Environmental Policy, (ii) Development Policy, and (iii) International Public Health Policy.
 MA in International Relations (one-year accelerated program)
 MA in Latin American Studies (one-year program)

Dual-degree programs
The Pardee School provides its students many opportunities for taking courses across all schools and colleges at Boston University. Four of its graduate degrees are offered in collaboration with other Schools and Colleges. These include two joint degrees listed above (MA in Global Development Policy and MA in International Relations and Communication). In addition the Pardee School also offers its graduate students the option for two Dual Degrees.
 MA in International Relations and Juris Doctor (IRJD)
 MA in International Relations and Master of Business Administration (IRMBA)

Graduate certificate programs
The Pardee School also offers three graduate certificate programs that are offered to all graduate students at Boston University.
 Graduate Certificate in African Studies
 Graduate Certificate in Asian Studies
 Graduate Certificate in Latin American Studies

Programs, centers and institutes
 African Studies Center
 Center for the Study of Asia
 Center for the Study of Europe
 Institute for the Study of Muslim Societies and Civilizations
 Center of Latin America Studies 
 Middle East and North Africa studies Program
 Institute on Culture, Religion and World Affairs

Notable faculty

 Andrew Bacevich, Professor of International Relations
 Houchang Chehabi, Professor Emeritus of International Relations
 David Fromkin, Professor Emeritus of International Relations
 Perry Mehrling, Professor of International Political Economy
 Vivien A. Schmidt, Professor of International Relations and Jean Monnet Chair of European Integration
 Jessica Stern, Research Professor of International Relations
 Scott Taylor, Dean

References

External links
 

Schools of international relations in the United States
Universities and colleges in Middlesex County, Massachusetts
Boston University
Educational institutions established in 2014
Educational buildings in Boston
2014 establishments in Massachusetts